Thomas Philander Ryder (June 29, 1836 – December 2, 1887) was an American composer, organist, teacher, conductor, and organ builder.

Ryder was born in Cohasset, Massachusetts.  He studied with Gustav Satter before taking a post as a church organist in Hyannis.  From 1879 he served at the Tremont Temple in Boston.  He also served as choirmaster and teacher, and compiled anthologies of sacred and secular partsongs.  He was also popular as a composer of hymns and parlor pieces for piano.  He died in Somerville, Massachusetts.

External links

References

"Thomas Philander Ryder". In  Greene, David Mason (1985). Biographical Dictionary of Composers.  Garden City, New York; Doubleday & Company, Inc.

1836 births
1887 deaths
American male composers
American organists
American male organists
People from Cohasset, Massachusetts
Politicians from Somerville, Massachusetts
19th-century American composers
People from Hyannis, Massachusetts
19th-century American male musicians
19th-century organists